The Hound of the Deep is a 1926 British–Australian silent drama film directed by Frank Hurley and starring Eric Bransby Williams, Lilian Douglas and Jameson Thomas. Unlike many Australian silent films, a copy of it survives today.

It was one of the first Australian films set on Thursday Island.

Plot
Under the terms of his uncle's will, John Strong (Eric Bransby Williams) must go to Thursday Island and find a pearl within two years or the Reuben Strong pearling station and his great wealth will revert to another, Black Darley (Jameson Thomas). Eventually Strong finds the pearl, defeats Darley and discovers romance with the daughter (Lillian Douglas) of an island trader (W.G. Saunders).

Cast
Eric Bransby Williams as John Strong 
Lilian Douglas as Marjorie Jones 
Jameson Thomas as 'Black' Darley 
W. G. Saunders as 'Cockeye' Jones 
Molly Johnson as Lady Cynthia 
Dallas Cairns as Mr. Bullyer

Production
After the disappointing reception to his documentaries in America, Hurley decided to go into dramatic feature films. He succeed in persuading the Australian-born British theatre magnate Sir Oswald Stoll to provide £10,000 and several actors and technicians to make two films in Papua and Thursday Island, this and Jungle Woman.

Hurley and his crew left Sydney in August 1925 and travelled to Thursday Island where they shot The Hound of the Deep.

Release
Reviews generally praised the photography but had reservations about the story.

The film was released in Britain as Pearl of the South Seas.

References

External links
The Hound of the Deep in the Internet Movie Database
Pearl of the South Sea at National Film and Sound Archive
Clip of cast members of the film being driven around Thursday Island at Australian Screen Online

1926 films
1926 drama films
Stoll Pictures films
British drama films
British black-and-white films
Australian silent feature films
British silent feature films
Australian black-and-white films
1920s British films
Silent drama films